Vanylvsfjorden is a fjord in western Norway, on the border of Vestland and Møre og Romsdal counties. The inner part of the fjord branches into the Syltefjorden and Kjødepollen.

There are settlements all around the shoreline of the fjord and on some of the islands at the mouth of the fjord.  Some of the larger, more notable villages on the shore of the fjord include Fiskåbygd, Sylte, Slagnes, Åheim (all in Vanylven) and Leikanger and Borgundvåg (in Selje).

The Haugsholmen Lighthouse is located in the outer part of the fjord.

See also
 List of Norwegian fjords

References

Fjords of Vestland
Fjords of Møre og Romsdal
Vanylven
Stad, Norway
Sande, Møre og Romsdal